This is a list of player transfers involving Rugby Pro D2 teams before or during the 2022–23 season. The list is of deals that are confirmed and are either from or to a rugby union team in the Pro D2 during the 2021–22 season. It is not unknown for confirmed deals to be cancelled at a later date. On 7 June 2022, Massy and Soyaux Angouleme are promoted to the Pro D2 for the 2022-23 season, whilst Bourg-en-Bresse and Narbonne are demoted to the Nationale competition for the 2022-23 season.

Agen

Players In
 Sonatane Takulua from  Toulon
 Antoine Erbani from  Biarritz 
 Malik Hamadache from  Montpellier 
 Baptiste Lafond from  Rouen 
 Mike Sosene-Feagai from  Toulon 
 Theo Sauzaret from  Chambéry 
 Evan Olmstead from  Biarritz 
 Theo Belan from  Provence 
 Richard Barrington from  Saracens
 Joe Maksymiw from  Dragons
 Elton Jantjies from  NTT DoCoMo Red Hurricanes Osaka
 Afa Amosa from  Bayonne

Players Out
 Malino Vanai to  Brive
 Gauthier Maravat to  Castres 
 Emilien Gailleton to  Pau
 Paul Graou to  Toulouse 
 Dave Ryan retired
 Camille Gérondeau retired 
 Laurence Pearce retired 
 Jessy Jegerlehner to  Provence
 Toby Salmon to  Rouen
 Alexandre Odinga to  Dijon 
 Theo Louvet to  Chartres 
 Löic Hocquet to  Valence d'Agen 
 Tapu Falatea to  Nevers

Aurillac

Players In
 Henzo Kiteau from  Clermont (season-long loan) 
 Robert Rodgers from  Montpellier (season-long loan)
 Eoghan Masterson from  Connacht

Players Out
 Lucas Seyrolle to  Montauban
 Paul Ferret to  Nice
 Adrian Moțoc to  Biarritz 
 Giorgi Tsutskiridze to  Stade Français 
 Pierre Roussel to  Albi
 Rhema Sagote to  Cognac Saint-Jean-d'Angély
 Bernard Reggiardo to  Dijon

Béziers

Players In
 Wilmar Arnoldi from  Free State Cheetahs 
 Mitch Short from  Racing 92 
 James Tofa from  Bourgoin-Jallieu 
 Yannick Arroyo from  Montpellier (season-long loan)

Players Out
 Lionel Beauxis retired 
 Thibaut Bisman retired
 Thomas Zenon to  Nevers 
 Lucas Delaye to  Bédarrides - Châteauneuf-du-Pape 
 Dorian Marco-Pena to  Valence Romans
 Morgan Eames to  Bristol Bears
 Jeff Williams to  RCB Arachnon

Biarritz

Players In
 Charlie Francoz from  Stade Français
 Thomas Sauveterre from  Carcassonne 
 Adrian Moțoc from  Aurillac 
 Nafi Ma'afu from  Perpignan 
 Simon Augry from  Montauban
 Killian Taofifenua from  Perpignan
 Joe Tomane from  Black Rams Tokyo
 Baptiste Germain from  Toulouse (season-long loan) 
 Tiaan Jacobs from  Selborne College 
 Lasha Tabidze from  Bordeaux 
 Tyler Morgan from  Scarlets 
 Luka Tchelidze from  Bayonne (season-long loan)

Players Out
 Francois Da Ros retired
 Gavin Stark to  Oyonnax
 Ximun Lucu retired 
 Mathieu Hirigoyen to  Stade Français 
 Lucas Peyresblanques to  Stade Français
 James Cronin to  Leicester Tigers 
 Steffon Armitage to  Nice 
 Vakhtang Akhobadze to  Carcassonne 
 Antoine Erbani to  Agen 
 Romain Ruffenach to  Pau
 Matteo Coutsalat to  Tarbes 
 Kevin Gimeno to  Montauban 
 Andrew Cramond retired 
 Evan Olmstead to  Agen 
 Clement Darbo retired
 Yvan Watremez retired 
 Ushangi Tcheishvili to  Massy 
 Remi Brosset to  Soyaux Angoulême
 Brieuc Plessis-Couillard to  Carcassonne 
 Francis Saili to  Racing 92

Carcassonne

Players In
 Clement Clavieres from  Castres 
 Etienne Herjean from  Oyonnax 
 Pierre Pages from  Vannes
 Jules Martinez from  Narbonne
 Pierre Aguillon from  Castres 
 Soso Bekoshvili from  Brive 
 Christopher Hilsenbeck from  Vannes 
 Gregory Annetta from  Provence 
 Stephane Onambele from  Castres 
 Vakhtang Akhobadze from  Biarritz
 Connor Sa from  Bordeaux (season-long loan)
 Rob Harley from  Glasgow Warriors
 Sami Mavinga from  Perpignan
 Brieuc Plessis-Couillard from  Biarritz 
 George Merrick from  Newcastle Falcons

Players Out 
 Aurelien Azar to  Castres 
 Pierre Huguet to  Bayonne
 Christaan van der Merwe to  Nevers
 Clement Doumenc to  Montpellier 
 Julien Facundo retired
 Benoit Lazaratto retired
 Andrei Ursache retired
 Louis-Matthieu Jazeix to  Suresnes 
 Thomas Sauveterre to  Biarritz 
 Johnny McPhillips to  Provence 
 Maxime Castant to  Bourgoin-Jallieu
 Gaetan Pichon to  Massy
 Felix Le Bourhis retired 
 Thierry Futeu to  Chartres

Colomiers

Players In
 Jack Whetton from  Castres
 Marco Fepulea'i from  LA Giltinis 
 Andrew Ready from  Western Force

Players Out
 Karl Chateau to  Vannes
 Clement Chartier to  Provence
 Jules Cordier to  Auch 
 Kane Palma-Newport to  Fleurance
 Florian Nicot retired
 Victor Leon to  Steaua București 
 Tom Deleuze to  Massy 
 Antoine Marty-Rybak to  Limoges
 Mihai Macovei to  RCB Arachnon

Grenoble

Players In
 Terrence Hepetema from  London Irish 
 Tala Gray from  Stade Français
 Vincent Viel from  Vienne 
 Sam Nixon from  Exeter Chiefs 
 Erwan Dridi from  Vannes

Players Out
 Adrien Seguret to  Castres
 Ange Capuozzo to  Toulouse 
 Nika Gvaladze to  Albi
 Timoci Nagusa to  Saint Jean en Royans 
 Jan Uys to  Zebre Parma
 Jeremy Valencot to  Bourg-en-Bresse
 Ilia Kaikatsishvili to  Nevers
 Julien Ruaud from  Rouen 
 Benito Masilevu to  Rouen
 Fabien Guillemin to  La Seyne

Massy

Players In
 Louis Bruinsma from  Mont-de-Marsan 
 James Voss from  Mont-de-Marsan 
 Abongile Nonkontwana from  Bourgoin-Jallieu
 Ushangi Tcheishvili from  Biarritz
 Kimami Sitauti from  Narbonne 
 Jamie-Jerry Taulagi from  Narbonne 
 Clement Lanen from  Clermont
 Dylan Lam from  Brive
 Gaetan Pichon from  Carcassonne
 Tom Deleuze from  Colomiers 
 Marco Fuser from  Newcastle Falcons
 Will Haydon-Wood from  Wasps

Players Out
 Jean-Baptiste Grenod to  Chambéry 
 Dany Antunes to  Union Cognac Saint-Jean 
 Pieter Morton to  Bourgoin-Jallieu 
 Joseph Penitito to  Macon

Mont-de-Marsan

Players In
 Max Curie from  Nevers
 Aston Fortuin from  Narbonne 
 Joris Pialot from  Narbonne 
 Gheorghe Gajion from  Oyonnax
 Martin Doan from  Montpellier 
 Misaele Petero from  Tel Aviv Heat
 Harrison Obatoyinbo from  Toulon 
 Ambrose Curtis from  Vannes

Players Out  
 Carlos Muzzio retired
 Léo Coly to  Montpellier
 Maxime Gouzou to  Lyon 
 Louis Bruinsma to  Massy 
 Victor Laval to  Montauban 
 Gauthier Doubrere to  Castres 
 Charlesty Berguet to  Vannes 
 Vereniki Goneva to  Chambéry
 James Voss to  Massy
 Lucio Sordoni to  Glasgow Warriors

Montauban

Players In
 Jean-Bernard Pujol from  Perpignan 
 Tyrone Viiga from  Provence
 Lucas Seyrolle from  Aurillac
 Semesa Rokoduguni from  Bath 
 Victor Laval from  Mont-de-Marsan
 Kevin Gimeno from  Biarritz 
 Shaun Venter from  Bayonne
 Sevanaia Galala from  Brive
 Bastien Guillemin from  Castres
 Romain Riguet from  Toulouse (season-long loan)
 Tedo Abzhandadze from  Brive
 Nicolas Solveyra from  Houston SaberCats
 Quentin Witt from  Provence
 Kevin Yameogo from  Pau (season-long loan)
 Otar Giorgadze from  Brive 
 Malino Vanai from  Brive 
 Tomas Lezana from  Scarlets

Players Out
 Kamaliele Tufele to  Nevers
 Stephane Ahmed to  Stade Français
 Jean Sousa retired 
 Simon Augry to  Biarritz
 Marvin Woki to  Nice 
 Franck Pourteau to  Rouen
 Quentin Pueyo to  Graulet 
 Pierre Commenge to  Albi
 Luke Stringer to  Albi
 Louis Druart to  Stade Français 
 Dylan Sage to  Hyères 
 Nikola Matawalu to  Pontypridd

Nevers

Players In
 Christaan van der Merwe from  Carcassonne
 Kamaliele Tufele from  Mont-de-Marsan
 Cleopas Kundiona from  Chambéry
 Arthur Barbier from  Marcq-en-Baroeul 
 Elia Elia from  Bourg-en-Bresse
 Christaan Erasmus from  Bourg-en-Bresse 
 Maku Polutele from  Chambéry 
 Dylan Jaminet from  Perpignan
 Steven David from  Valence Romans
 Ilia Kaikatsishvili from  Grenoble
 Thomas Zenon from  Béziers 
 Lasha Jaiani from  The Black Lion 
 Tapu Falatea from  Agen

Players Out
 Janick Tarrit to  Racing 92 
 Thomas Ceyte to   Bayonne
 Max Curie to  Mont-de-Marsan
 Joris Cazenave to  Provence
 Frank Bradshaw Ryan to  Ulster
 Hugo Fabregue to  Oyonnax
 Romaric Camou to  Vannes 
 Theophile Cotte to  Bourgoin-Jallieu 
 Stephane Bonvalot retired
 Fabien Witz to  Chambéry 
 Jean-Baptiste Manevy retired
 Nicolas Vuillemin to  Bourgoin-Jallieu 
 Francois Herry to  Marcq-en-Baroeul 
 Sevuloni Mocenacagi to  Rouen
 Oktay Yilmaz to  Bourgoin-Jallieu

Oyonnax

Players In
 Filimo Taofifenua from  Bayonne
 Antoine Abraham from  Vannes 
 Gavin Stark from  Biarritz 
 Victor Lebas from  Brive
 Hugo Fabregue from  Nevers 
 Steve Mafi from  London Irish
 Wandrille Picault from  Vannes
 Joe Ravouvou from  Bayonne
 Hugo Hermet from  Castres
 Chris Farrell from  Munster

Players Out
 Sacha Zegueur to  Pau
 Etienne Herjean to  Carcassonne
 Manuel Leindekar to  Bayonne
 Valentin Ursache retired 
 Bilel Taieb to  Provence 
 Gheorghe Gajion to  Mont-de-Marsan
 Thibault Lassalle retired 
 Adrian Sanday to  Provence
 Nail Audoire to  Chambéry
 Joffrey Michel to  Saint Jean-de-Luz

Provence

Players In
 Joris Cazenave from  Nevers
 Teimana Harrison from  Northampton Saints 
 Adrien Lapegue from  Stade Français 
 Johnny McPhillips from  Carcassonne
 Clement Chartier from  Colomiers
 Bilel Taieb from  Oyonnax
 Jessy Jegerlehner from  Agen
 Adrien Lapegue from  Stade Français 
 Adrian Sanday from  Oyonnax
 Julius Nostadt from  Castres

Players Out
 Tyrone Viiga to  Montauban
 Seremaia Burotu to  Bédarrides-Châteauneuf-du-Pape 
 Gregory Annetta to  Carcassonne
 Antoine Bousquet to  Tarbes 
 Theo Belan to  Agen
 Quentin Witt to  Montauban
 Adrien Bau to  Soyaux Angoulême
 Karl-Robin Malanda to  RCB Arachnon 
 Eroni Sau to  Fijian Drua

Rouen

Players In
 Soulemane Camara from  Chambéry
 Raphaël Vielledant from  Chambéry
 Cody Thomas from  Brive
 Florent Campeggia from  Bourg-en-Bresse
 Thibault Olender from  Bourg-en-Bresse
 Julien Ruaud from  Grenoble 
 Efi Ma'afu from  Melbourne Rebels 
 Franck Pourteau from  Montauban
 Sevuloni Mocenacagi from  Nevers 
 Toby Salmon from  Agen 
 Benito Masilevu from  Grenoble 
 Mohamed Boughanmi from  Narbonne

Players Out
 Erwan Nicolas to  Vannes 
 Baptiste Lafond to  Agen
 Fabien Dorey retired 
 Hugo N'Diaye to  Stade Français 
 Bastien Cazale-Debat to  RCB Arachnon 
 Karlen Asieshvili retired
 Marvin Woki to  Nice 
 Audric Sanlaville to  Bourg-en-Bresse
 Omar Dahir to  Soyaux Angoulême
 Lucas Cazac to  Hyeres 
 Nadir Megdoud to  Stade Français

Soyaux Angoulême

Players In
 Kevin Le Guen from  Racing 92
 Jacob Botica from  Rennes 
 Remi Brosset from  Biarritz
 Omar Dahir from  Rouen
 Adrien Bau from  Provence
 Matt Beukeboom from  Bourg-en-Bresse 
 Nicolas Martins from  Castanet 
 Yassine Jarmouni from  Aubenas Vals 
 Michel Himmer from  La Rochelle
 Rayne Barka from  Pau (season-long loan) 
 Manasa Saulo from  Fijian Drua 
 James Tedder from  Lions

Players Out
 Ziana Alexis to  Perigueux 
 Robin Copeland retired
 Younes El Jai retired
 Francois Fontane to  Albi
 Guillaume Laforgue retired
 Benjamin Pehau to  Albi
 Shalva Sutiashvili retired
 Metusiela Talebula to  Aubenas Vals

Vannes

Players In
 Romaric Camou from  Nevers
 William Percillier from  Stade Français (season-long loan) 
 Maxime Lafage from  Bayonne
 Juan Bautista Pedemonte from  Jaguares XV 
 Karl Chateau from  Colomiers
 Erwan Nicolas from  Rouen
 Ximun Bessonart from  Tarbes 
 Jean Chezeau from  Racing 92 (season-long loan)
 John Afoa from  Bristol Bears 
 Charlesty Berguet from  Mont-de-Marsan
 Theo Costosseque from  Bayonne
 Enzo Baggiani from  Bordeaux
 Nathanaël Hulleu from  Bordeaux (season-long loan)
 Florent Campeggia from  Bourg-en-Bresse 
 Andrés Vilaseca from  Peñarol

Players Out
 Rodrigo Bruni to  Brive
 Antoine Abraham to  Oyonnax
 Pierre Pages to  Carcassonne
 Wandrille Picault to  Oyonnax
 Andy Symons retired 
 Maёlan Rabut to  Toulon 
 Christopher Hilsenbeck to  Carcassonne
 Darren Barry retired 
 Blaise Dumas retired 
 Morgan Phelipponneau retired
 Lilian Saseras retired
 Erwan Dridi to  Grenoble
 Lucas Dycke to  Suresnes
 Ambrose Curtis to  Mont-de-Marsan
 Rodney Ah You to  Limoges

See also
List of 2022–23 Premiership Rugby transfers
List of 2022–23 United Rugby Championship transfers
List of 2022–23 Super Rugby transfers
List of 2022–23 Top 14 transfers
List of 2022–23 RFU Championship transfers
List of 2022–23 Major League Rugby transfers

References

2021-22
2022–23 in French rugby union